Chocolate syrup is a sweet, chocolate-flavored condiment. It is often used as a topping or dessert sauce for various desserts, such as ice cream, or mixed with milk to make chocolate milk or blended with milk and ice cream to make a chocolate milkshake. Chocolate syrup is sold in a variety of consistencies, ranging from a thin liquid that can be drizzled from a bottle to a thick sauce that needs to be spooned onto the dessert item.

Chocolate syrup is also used to top puddings and cakes. Some restaurants use an artistic drizzling of chocolate syrup to decorate servings of cheesecake or cake, along with other decorations such as cocoa powder, powdered sugar or chocolate shavings. Some brands of chocolate syrup are marketed as chocolate milk syrup (e.g., Nesquik). Other brands are marketed as ice cream sundae toppings.

Ingredients
A simple chocolate syrup can be made from unsweetened cocoa powder, a sweetener such as sugar, and water. Recipes may also include other ingredients, such as corn syrup, malt, and flavorings like vanilla extract.

Industrial recipes may contain ingredients such as:

High fructose corn syrup
Corn syrup
Water
Sugar
Cocoa
Potassium sorbate (preservative)
Salt
Mono and diglycerides (emusilfier)
Polysorbate 60
Xanthan gum
Vanillin (artificial flavoring)

Other uses
Beginning in the 1890s, chocolate syrup was marketed as a treatment for ailments, including for infants suffering from colic. In part due to the passage of the 1906 Pure Food and Drug Act, which required clear and accurate labeling, chocolate syrup began to transition from primarily medical application to commercial use.

Chocolate syrup was often used in black-and-white movies to simulate blood, because it was safe for the performers to swallow, easy to get out of clothing, and cheap to buy. It also has an effective-looking viscosity on film. The effect was used in many movies, including The Wasp Woman and Psycho.

Products
 Fox's U-bet chocolate syrup
 Somebody's Mother's Chocolate Sauce
 Bosco Chocolate Syrup
 Hershey's Chocolate Syrup
 Culver's Chocolate Syrup
 Nestle Nesquik Chocolate Syrup

See also

 Ganache, the melted chocolate and cream preparation
 Hot fudge, a thick chocolate sauce
 List of dessert sauces
 List of syrups

References

Chocolate
Dessert sauces
Syrup
Toppings